was a Japanese manga writer/artist. His works belong to the gekiga, or "dramatic pictures", genre of manga. In France he was knighted a Chevalier of the Ordre des Arts et des Lettres in 2011.

Career

Taniguchi began his career as an assistant of manga artist Kyuuta Ishikawa. He made his manga debut in 1970 with Kareta Heya (A Desiccated Summer), published in the magazine Young Comic.

From 1978 to 1986, he created several hard-boiled comics with the scenarist Natsuo Sekigawa, such as City Without Defense, The Wind of the West is White and Lindo 3. From 1987 to 1996, Taniguchi and Natsuo Sekigawa produced the 5-volume series Botchan no Jidai.

He illustrated Baku Yumemakura’s works, Garouden from 1989 to 1990 and Kamigami no itadaki (The Summit of the Gods) from 2000 to 2003. He later received awards at the Angoulême International Comics Festival in 2002 and 2005. For Kamigami no itadaki, he hiked to Kathmandu, Nepal for research.

In 1997, he created the Ikaru (Icarus) series with texts by Mœbius.

Jiro Taniguchi gained several prizes for his work. Among others, the Osamu Tezuka Culture Award (1998) for the series Botchan no Jidai, the Shogakukan prize with Inu o Kau, and in 2003, the Alph'Art of the best scenario at the Angoulême International Comics Festival (France) for A Distant Neighborhood. His work has been translated in many languages. Mexican filmmaker Guillermo del Toro praised his work, stating that "Taniguchi was a manga poet, the Kieslowski of the page and a serene, profound observer of the world."

A Distant Neighborhood was adapted into a live-action Belgian film in 2010.

Taniguchi has cited Hiroshi Hirata, Takao Saito, Moribi Murano, and Kyuuta Ishikawa as major influences.

Taniguchi died on 11 February 2017 in Tokyo, at the age of 69.

Bibliography

1980s and earlier
1979 – Lindo 3!
1980 – Muboubi Toshi
1980 – Ooinaru Yasei
1981/03 – Jiken Ya Kagyou – Trouble is my Business
1982/03 – Blue Fighter (Ao no Senshi)
1982/03 – Hunting Dog
1983/08 – Knuckle Wars – The Fist of Rebellion (Nakkuru Wōzu – Ken no Ran)
1983/03 – Shin Jiken Ya Kagyou – New Trouble is my Business
1983/09 – Live! Odyssey
1984/02 – Seifuu Ha Shiroi
1984/12 – Rude Boy
1985/10 – Enemigo
1986/01 – Hotel Harbour View
1986/10 – Blanca
1987/06 – , based on Botchan, a 1906 novel by Natsume Sōseki
1988/05 – K
1988/06 – Ice Age Chronicle of the Earth

1990s
1990/01 – Genju Jiten
1990/09 – Garouden (Hungry Wolves Legend)
1991/06 – Samurai Non Grata
1992/04 – Aruku Hito –(歩くひと, translated in French as L'Homme qui Marche and English as The Walking Man)
1992/09 – Kaze No Sho (translated in English as Samurai Legend)
1992/10 – Inu wo Kau
1993/09 – Keyaki no Ki (translated in French as L'orme du Caucase)
1994/09 – Mori He – Into the Forest
1994/11 – A Journal of My Father
1996/04 – 
1996/07 – Blanca II (Dog of God)
1997/10 – Kodoku no Gourmet
1998/09 – Haruka na Machi e (translated in English as A Distant Neighborhood – translated in French as Quartier Lointain)
1999/01 – Tokyo Genshi Gyou
1999/12 – The Quest for the Missing Girl

2000s
2000/11/30 – Ikaru
2000/12 – Kamigami no Itadaki (The Summit of the Gods)
2002/09 – Ten no Taka – Sky Hawk
2004/11 – Toudo no Tabibito – The Ice Wanderer
2005/03 – Seton
2005/12 –  – A Bright Blue Sky (translated in French as Un ciel radieux)
2006/03 – Sampo Mono
2007/09 – Mahou no Yama (The Magic Mountain)
2008/03 – Fuyu no Doubutsuen (A Zoo in Winter)

2010s
2012 – Furari (ふらり)
2013 – Tomoji (とも路)
2013 – My Year
2014 – Guardians of the Louvre
2014 – Venice (Louis Vuitton Malletier)

References

External links

 Jiro Taniguchi's Town (his approved fan-site)

 
1947 births
2017 deaths
Manga artists from Tottori Prefecture
Chevaliers of the Ordre des Arts et des Lettres